"Burning Down the House" is a song by new wave band Talking Heads, released in July 1983 as the first single from their fifth studio album Speaking in Tongues.

Inspiration and composition
"Burning Down the House" is a new wave and funk song. "This song started from a jam," says bassist Tina Weymouth in the liner notes of Once in a Lifetime: The Best of Talking Heads. "Chris [Frantz] had just been to see Parliament-Funkadelic in its full glory at Madison Square Garden, and he was really hyped. During the jam, he kept yelling 'Burn down the house!' which was a P-Funk audience chant, and David [Byrne] dug the line, changing it to the finished version, 'Burning down the house'." (Bernie Worrell of Parliament-Funkadelic joined Talking Heads' live incarnation.)

The initial lyrics were considerably different, however. In an interview on NPR's All Things Considered aired on December 2, 1984, David Byrne played excerpts of early worktapes showing how the song had evolved from an instrumental jam by Weymouth and Frantz. Once the whole band had reworked the groove into something resembling the final recording, Byrne began chanting and singing nonsense syllables over the music until he arrived at phrasing that fit with the rhythms—a technique influenced by former Talking Heads producer Brian Eno: "and then I [would] just write words to fit that phrasing... I'd have loads and loads of phrases collected that I thought thematically had something to do with one another, and I'd pick from those."

According to Byrne in the NPR interview, phrases that he tried but ultimately did not use in the song included "I have another body," "Pick it up by the handle," "You travel with a double," and "I'm still under construction."  As for the title phrase in the chorus, one early attempt (as heard on a worktape) had him singing a different line, "What are we gonna do?", and at another point in the process, "instead of chanting 'Burning Down the House,' I was chanting 'Foam Rubber, USA.'"

Music video
The video, produced and directed by Byrne, alternates primarily between footage of the band performing the song in an empty ballroom, Byrne playing while facing a projection screen that displays a concert crowd or a wall of flames at different times, and images projected on the outside wall of a house. A young boy resembling Byrne takes his place from time to time; eventually, younger counterparts start moving the arms of all four band members to play the music. After the screen goes blank, both young and adult Byrne leave the stage, and the video ends with an extended close-up of Byrne's face projected on a highway at night.

The house used in the video is located on Myrtle Street in Union, New Jersey. Max Illidge (credited as Max Loving), vocalist of the band 40 Below Summer, and Rockets Redglare appear as the younger selves of Byrne and Jerry Harrison, respectively.

Chart performance
Despite this success, the song was not a hit outside of North America. In Australia it peaked at a modest , while in the UK, where Talking Heads would release 14 charting singles, it failed to make the charts at all (although a cover version of the song by Tom Jones and The Cardigans would make the UK Top 10 in 1999).

Track listings
7-inch single
A. "Burning Down the House" – 4:00
B. "I Get Wild / Wild Gravity" – 4:06

UK 12-inch single
A1. "Burning Down the House" (album version)
A2. "I Get Wild / Wild Gravity" (cassette version)
B1. "Moon Rocks" (cassette version)

Personnel

Talking Heads
 David Byrne – guitars, lead vocals
 Jerry Harrison – synthesizers
 Tina Weymouth – synth bass
 Chris Frantz – drums, backing vocals

Additional personnel
 Wally Badarou – synthesizers
 Steve Scales – percussion

Charts

Weekly charts

Year-end charts

Tom Jones and the Cardigans version 

Welsh singer Tom Jones recorded a version of "Burning Down the House" with Swedish pop band the Cardigans for his 1999 collaborations album, Reload. In common with the other tracks on the album, the recording was made with the collaborators' choice of producer and studio, in this case Tore Johansson and Tambourine Studios in Malmö, Sweden.

The track was released as the lead single from Reload on September 13, 1999, and became a hit across Europe and Australia, reaching No. 1 in Iceland, No. 2 in Sweden, and the top ten in Australia, Denmark, Finland, Hungary, Norway and the United Kingdom. The single was backed with Jones' live recordings of the EMF song "Unbelievable" and the Beatles' "Come Together", as well as remixes of "Burning Down the House" by Delakota, Pepe Deluxé and DJ Scissorkicks.

As one of the major hits of Jones' later career, it appears on numerous compilations of Jones' work. It also features on the Cardigans' 2008 Best Of album.

Track listings
UK CD1; Australian CD2; Japanese CD single
 "Burning Down the House"
 "Burning Down the House" (Delakota mix)
 "Burning Down the House" (Pepe Deluxé mix)
 "Burning Down the House" (DJ Scissorkicks instrumental mix)

UK CD2
 "Burning Down the House"
 "Unbelievable" (Tom Jones live)
 "Come Together" (Tom Jones live)

UK cassette single
 "Burning Down the House"
 "Burning Down the House" (Delakota mix)
 "Burning Down the House" (Pepe Deluxé mix)

European CD single
 "Burning Down the House" (album version) – 3:38
 "Come Together" (Tom Jones live) – 4:14

European maxi-CD single
 "Burning Down the House" (album version) – 3:38
 "Unbelievable" (Tom Jones live) – 4:10
 "Come Together" (Tom Jones live) – 4:12
 "Burning Down the House" (Delakota mix) – 5:00
 "Burning Down the House" (Pepe Deluxé mix) – 4:10

Australian CD1
 "Burning Down the House"
 "Burning Down the House" (Delakota mix)
 "Burning Down the House" (Pepe Deluxé mix)
 "Burning Down the House" (DJ Scissorkicks instrumental mix)
 "Unbelievable" (Tom Jones live)
 "Come Together" (Tom Jones live)

Credits and personnel
Credits are adapted from the Reload album booklet.

Studio
 Recorded at Tambourine Studios (Malmö, Sweden)
 Mastered at The Soundmasters (London, England)

Personnel

 David Byrne – writing
 Tina Weymouth – writing
 Chris Frantz – writing
 Jerry Harrison – writing
 Tom Jones – vocals
 Nina Persson – vocals
 Tore Johansson – backing vocals, additional keyboards, production
 Lynette Koyana – backing vocals
 Per Sunding – backing vocals
 Patrik Bartosch – backing vocals
 Maurits Carlsson – backing vocals
 Peter Svensson – guitar
 Lasse Johansson – guitar, keyboards
 Pece Masalkovski – additional guitars
 Magnus Sveningsson – bass
 Bengt Lagerberg – drums
 Jens Lindgård – horns
 Petter Lindgård – horns
 Sven Andersson – horns
 Hello Bobadee – horn arrangement
 Kevin Metcalf – mastering

Charts

Weekly charts

Year-end charts

Certifications

References

External links
 Music video of the song on YouTube

Talking Heads songs
1983 singles
Tom Jones (singer) songs
The Cardigans songs
Songs written by David Byrne
Sire Records singles
V2 Records singles
Song recordings produced by David Byrne
Songs written by Jerry Harrison
Songs written by Chris Frantz
Songs written by Tina Weymouth
Song recordings produced by Jerry Harrison
1983 songs
Number-one singles in Iceland